Brielle is a modern English feminine given name, a short form of the French name Gabrielle.

Popularity 
The name is increasing in popularity in the United States. It has ranked among the top 1,000 names in the United States since 1991, among the top 500 names since 2004, and among the top 200 names since 2010. It was the 99th most popular given name for American girls in 2020 and the 118th name for girls in 2021.

Notes 

Feminine given names